An aglycone (aglycon or genin) is the compound remaining after the glycosyl group on a glycoside is replaced by a hydrogen atom. For example, the aglycone of a cardiac glycoside would be a steroid molecule.

Detection 

A way to identify aglycone is proposed to extract it from Agave spp. by using H-NMR and Heteronuclear multiple bond correlation (HMBC) experiments. The HMBC experiment can be combined with other techniques such as mass spectrometry to further examine the structure and the function of aglycone.

Samples of glycones and glycosides from limonoids can be simultaneously quantified through a high performance liquid chromatography (HPLC) method, where a binary solvent system and a diode array detector separate and detect them at a sensitivity of 0.25-0.50 µg.

Clinical significance 

A study on molecular markers in human aortic endothelial cells published that aglycone stopped cell migration but not monocyte adhesion, which is the initial step of atherosclerotic plaque formation. Another study exploring the benefits of extra virgin olive oil consumption in preventing age-related neurodegenerative diseases found aglycone greatly increased the cognitive performance of mice. The aglycone-fed mice displayed strong autophagic reactions, mTOR regulation, and reduced plaque deposits and ß-amyloid levels.

See also 
 Glucoside

References

External links 

Carbohydrate chemistry
Glycosides by aglycone type